This stadium is located on the Jubail-Dhahran highway near the city of Qatif in the Eastern Province of Saudi Arabia. It is named after the Saudi prince himself.

The tenant clubs for this stadium include Al-Khaleej of Saihat and Modhar of Qatif.

It is about 20 km east of King Fahd International Airport.

Sports venues in Saudi Arabia